The Cherry Orchard is the last play by Russian playwright Anton Chekhov. Written in 1903, it was first published by Znaniye (Book Two, 1904), and came out as a separate edition later that year in Saint Petersburg, via A.F. Marks Publishers. It opened at the Moscow Art Theatre on 17 January 1904 in a production directed by Konstantin Stanislavski. Chekhov described the play as a comedy, with some elements of farce, though Stanislavski treated it as a tragedy. Since its first production, directors have contended with its dual nature. It is often identified as one of the three or four outstanding plays by Chekhov, along with The Seagull, Three Sisters, and Uncle Vanya.

The play revolves around an aristocratic Russian landowner who returns to her family estate (which includes a large and well-known cherry orchard) just before it is auctioned to pay the mortgage. Unresponsive to offers to save the estate, she allows its sale to the son of a former serf; the family leaves to the sound of the cherry orchard being cut down. The story presents themes of cultural futility – both the futile attempts of the aristocracy to maintain its status and of the bourgeoisie to find meaning in its new-found materialism. It dramatizes the socioeconomic forces in Russia at the turn of the 20th century, including the rise of the middle class after the abolition of serfdom in the mid-19th century and the decline of the power of the aristocracy.

Widely regarded as a classic of 20th-century theatre, the play has been translated and adapted into many languages and produced around the world. Major theatre directors have staged it, including Charles Laughton, Peter Brook, Andrei Șerban, Jean-Louis Barrault, Tyrone Guthrie, Katie Mitchell, and Giorgio Strehler. It has influenced many other playwrights, including Eugene O'Neill, George Bernard Shaw, David Mamet, and Arthur Miller.

Characters
The spelling of character names depends on the transliteration used.

 Madame Lyubov Andreievna Ranevskaya – a landowner. Ranyevskaya is the linchpin around which the other characters revolve. A commanding and popular figure, she represents the pride of the old aristocracy, now fallen on hard times. Her confused feelings of love for her old home and sorrow at the scene of her son's death, give her an emotional depth that keeps her from devolving into a mere aristocratic grotesque. Most of her humor comes from her inability to understand financial or business matters.
 Peter Trofimov – a student and Anya's friend. Trofimov is depicted as an "eternal" (in some translations, "wandering") student. An impassioned left-wing political commentator, he represents the rising tide of reformist political opinion in Russia, which struggled to find its place within the authoritarian Czarist autocracy.
 Boris Borisovich Simeonov-Pishchik – a landowner and another old aristocrat whose estate has hit hard times. He is constantly discussing new business ventures that may save him and badgering Ranyevskaya for a loan. His character embodies the irony of the aristocracy's position: despite his financial peril, he spends the play relaxing and socializing with the Gayevs.
 Anya – Lyubov's daughter, aged seventeen. She journeys to Paris to rescue her mother from her desperate situation. She is a virtuous and strong young woman. She is close to Trofimov and listens to his revolutionary ideas, although she may or may not be taking them in.
 Varya – Lyubov's adopted daughter, aged twenty-four. Varya is the one who manages the estate and keeps everything in order. She is the rock that holds the family together. The reason why Ranevskaya adopted her is never made clear, although she is mentioned to have come from "simple people" (most likely serfs). Varya fantasizes about becoming a nun, though she lacks the financial means to do so. She adores her mother and sister, and frets about money constantly. Her relationship to Lopakhin is a mysterious one; everyone in the play assumes that they are about to be married but neither of them act on it.
 Leonid Andreieveitch Gayev – the brother of Madame Ranevskaya. One of the more obviously comic characters, Gayev is a talkative eccentric. His addiction to billiards (often manifesting itself at times of discomfort) is symbolic of the aristocracy's decadent life of leisure, which renders them impotent in the face of change. Gayev tries hard to save his family and estate, but ultimately, as an aristocrat, either lacks the drive, or doesn't understand the real world mechanisms necessary to realize his goals.
 Yermolai Alexeievitch Lopakhin – a merchant. Lopakhin is by far the wealthiest character in the play, but comes from the lowest social class, as his father was a peasant and his grandfather was a serf. This contrast defines his character: he enjoys living the high life, but at the same time is uncomfortably conscious of his low beginnings and obsession with business. He is often portrayed on stage as an unpleasant character because of his greedy tendencies and ultimate betrayal of the Gayev family, but there is nothing in the play to suggest this: he works strenuously to help the Gayevs, but to no avail. Lopakhin represents the new middle class in Russia, one of many threats to the old aristocratic way of doing things.
 Charlotta Ivanovna – a governess. By far the most eccentric character, Charlotta is the only governess the Gayevs could afford and is a companion for Anya. She is a melancholy figure, raised by a German woman without any real knowledge of who her circus entertainer parents were. She performs card tricks and ventriloquism at the party in the third act and accepts the loss of her station, when the family disbands, with pragmatism.
 Yepikhodov – a clerk. The Gayev's estate clerk is another source of comedy. He is unfortunate and clumsy in the extreme, earning him the insulting nickname "Twenty-Two Calamities" (the nickname varies between translations) mostly invoked by Yasha. He considers himself to be in love with Dunyasha, whom he has asked to marry him.
 Dunyasha – a housemaid. Like Lopakhin, she is another example of social mobility in Russia at the time. A peasant who is employed as the Gayev's chambermaid, Dunyasha is an attention seeker, making big scenes and dressing as a lady to show herself off. She is in some respects representative of the aristocracy's impotence, as a lowly chambermaid would not in the past have had the freedom to dress like a lady and flirt with the menservants. Although pursued romantically by Yepikhodov, she is in love with Yasha, attracted to the culture he has picked up in Paris.
 Firs – a manservant, aged 87. An aging eccentric, Firs considers the emancipation of the Russian serfs a disaster, and talks nostalgically of the old days when everybody admired their masters and owners, such as Gayev's parents and grandparents. His senility is a source of much of the play's poignancy, symbolizing the decay of the old order into muttering madness.
 Yasha – a young manservant, accompanying Lyubov on her way back from Paris and desperate to return. Yasha represents the new, disaffected Russian generation, who dislike the staid old ways and who will be the footsoldiers of the revolution. A rude, inconsiderate and predatory young man, Yasha, like Dunyasha and Charlotta, is the best the Gayevs can afford. He toys with the girlish affections of Dunyasha, the maid.
 A Stranger – a passer-by who encounters the Gayevs as they laze around on their estate during Act II. He is symbolic of the intrusion of new ideologies and social movements that infringed on the aristocracy's peace in Russia at the turn of the 20th century.
 The Stationmaster and The Postmaster – Both officials attend the Gayevs' party in Act III. Although they both play minor roles (the Stationmaster attempts to recite a poem, and the Postmaster flirts with Dunyasha), they are mostly symbols of the deprecation of the aristocracy in 1900s Russia – Firs comments that, whereas once they had barons and lords at the ball, now it's the postman and the stationmaster, and even they come only to be polite.
 Grisha – The son of Lyubov, drowned many years ago before her sojourn to Paris. She is reminded of his existence through the presence of Trofimov, who was his tutor.
 Guests, servants, and others.

Plot
The play opens in the early morning hours of a cool day in May in the nursery of Lyubov Andreyevna Ranevskaya's ancestral estate, somewhere in the provinces of Russia just after the turn of the 20th century. Ranevskaya has been living with an unnamed lover in France for five years, ever since her young son drowned. After receiving news that she had tried to kill herself, Ranevskaya's 17-year-old daughter Anya and Anya's governess Charlotta Ivanovna have gone to fetch her and bring her home to Russia. They are accompanied by Yasha, Ranevskaya's valet who was with her in France. Upon returning, the group is met by Lopakhin, Dunyasha, Varya (who has overseen the estate in Ranevskaya's absence), Leonid Andreyevich Gayev, Boris Borisovich Simeonov-Pishchik, Semyon Yepikhodov, and Firs.

Lopakhin has come to remind Ranevskaya and Gayev that their estate, including the cherry orchard, is due to go to auction in August to pay off the family's debts. He proposes to save the estate by allowing part of it to be developed into summer cottages; however, this would require the destruction of their famous cherry orchard, which is nationally known for its size.

Ranevskaya is enjoying the view of the orchard as day breaks when she is surprised by Peter Trofimov, a young student and the former tutor of Ranevskaya's son, Grisha, whose death prompted Ranevskaya to leave Russia five years ago. Much to the consternation of Varya, Trofimov had insisted on seeing Ranevskaya upon her return, and she is grief-stricken at the reminder of this tragedy.

After Ranevskaya retires for the evening, Anya confesses to Varya that their mother is heavily in debt. They all go to bed with renewed hope that the estate will be saved and the cherry orchard preserved. Trofimov stares after the departing Anya and mutters "My sunshine, my spring" in adoration.

Act II takes place outdoors in mid-summer on the family estate, near the cherry orchard. The act opens with Yepikhodov and Yasha trying for the affection of Dunyasha, by singing and playing guitar, while Charlotta soliloquizes about her life as she cleans a rifle. In Act I it was revealed that Yepikhodov proposed to Dunyasha around Easter; however, she has since become infatuated with the more "cultured" Yasha. Charlotta leaves so that Dunyasha and Yasha might have some time alone, but that is interrupted when they hear their employer coming. Yasha shoos Dunyasha away to avoid being caught, and Ranevskaya, Gayev, and Lopakhin appear, once more discussing the uncertain fate of the cherry orchard. Shortly Anya, Varya, and Trofimov arrive as well. Lopakhin teases Trofimov for being a perpetual student, and Trofimov espouses his philosophy of work and useful purpose, to the delight and humour of everyone around. During their conversations, a drunken and disheveled vagrant passes by and begs for money; Ranevskaya thoughtlessly gives him all of her money, despite the protestations of Varya. Shaken by the disturbance, the family departs for dinner, with Lopakhin futilely insisting that the cherry orchard be sold to pay down the debt. Anya stays behind to talk with Trofimov, who disapproves of Varya's constant hawk-like eyes, reassuring Anya that they are 'above love'. To impress Trofimov and win his affection, Anya vows to leave the past behind her and start a new life. The two depart for the river as Varya calls scoldingly in the background.

It is the end of August, and the evening of Ranevskaya's party has come. Off-stage the musicians play as the family and their guests drink, carouse, and entertain themselves. It is also the day of the auction of the estate and the cherry orchard; Gayev has received a paltry amount of money from his and Ranevskaya's stingy aunt in Yaroslavl, and the family members, despite the general merriment around them, are both anxious and distracted while they wait for word of their fates. Varya worries about paying the musicians and scolds their neighbour Pishchik for drinking, Dunyasha for dancing, and Yepikhodov for playing billiards. Charlotta entertains the group by performing several magic tricks. Ranevskaya scolds Trofimov for his constant teasing of Varya, whom he refers to as "Madame Lopakhin". She then urges Varya to marry Lopakhin, but Varya demurs, reminding her that it is Lopakhin's duty to ask for her hand in marriage, not the other way around. She says that if she had money she would move as far away from him as possible. Left alone with Ranevskaya, Trofimov insists that she finally face the truth that the house and the cherry orchard will be sold at auction. Ranevskaya shows him a telegram she has received from Paris and reveals that her former lover is ill again and has begged for her to return to aid him. She says that she is seriously considering joining him, despite his cruel behaviour to her in the past. Trofimov is stunned at this news and the two argue about the nature of love and their respective experiences. Trofimov leaves in a huff, but falls down the stairs off-stage and is carried in by the others. Ranevskaya laughs and forgives him for his folly and the two quickly reconcile. Anya enters, declaring a rumour that the cherry orchard has been sold. Lopakhin arrives with Gayev, both of whom are exhausted from the trip and the day's events. Gayev is distant, virtually catatonic, and goes to bed without saying a word of the outcome of the auction. When Ranevskaya asks who bought the estate, Lopakhin reveals that he himself is the purchaser and intends to chop down the orchard with his axe. Ranevskaya, distraught, clings to Anya, who tries to calm her and reassure her that the future will be better now that the cherry orchard has been sold.

Several weeks later, once again in the nursery (as in Act I), the family's belongings are being packed away as the family prepares to leave the estate forever. Trofimov enters in search of his galoshes, and he and Lopakhin exchange opposing world views. Anya enters and reprimands Lopakhin for ordering his workers to begin chopping down the cherry orchard even while the family is still in the house. Lopakhin apologizes and rushes out to stop them for the time being, in the hopes that he will be somehow reconciled with the leaving family. Charlotta enters, lost and in a daze, and insists that the family find her a new position. Ranevskaya tearfully bids her old life goodbye and leaves as the house is shut up forever. In the darkness, Firs wanders into the room and discovers that they have left without him and boarded him inside the abandoned house to die. He lies down on the couch and resigns himself to this fate (possibly dying on the spot). Off-stage we hear the axes as they cut down the cherry orchard.

Themes
One of the main themes of the play is the effect social change has on people. The emancipation of the serfs on 19 February 1861 by Alexander II allowed former serfs to gain wealth and status while some aristocrats were becoming impoverished, unable to tend their estates without the cheap labor of slavery. The effect of these reforms was still being felt when Chekhov was writing forty years after the mass emancipation.

Chekhov originally intended the play as a comedy (indeed, the title page of the work refers to it as such), and in letters noted that it is, in places, almost farcical. When he saw the original Moscow Art Theatre production directed by Konstantin Stanislavski, he was horrified to find that the director had moulded the play into a tragedy. Ever since that time, productions have had to struggle with this dual nature of the play (and of Chekhov's works in general).
Ranevskaya's failure to address problems facing her estate and family mean that she eventually loses almost everything and her fate can be seen as a criticism of those people who are unwilling to adapt to the new Russia. Her petulant refusal to accept the truth of her past, in both life and love, is her downfall throughout the play. She ultimately runs between her life in Paris and in Russia (she arrives from Paris at the start of the play and returns there afterwards). She is a woman who lives in an illusion of the past (often reliving memories about her son's death, etc.). The speeches by the student Trofimov, attacking intellectuals were later seen as early manifestations of Bolshevik ideas and his lines were often censored by the Tsarist officials. Cherry trees themselves are often seen as symbols of sadness or regret at the passing away of a certain situation or of the times in general.

The idea of independence and freedom is relevant to the positions of Firs and Lopakhin. Firs has been with the estate for decades, and all he has ever known is to serve his masters. When the news of the orchard being sold breaks, Firs seems unfazed, and continues to carry out his duties, but is unable to find his independence and freedom; Lopakhin was able to "free" himself, in the sense that he was able to find motivation to keep on going. Even though the two are polar opposites on the social ladder, they both have internal struggles regarding what their life is going to be after the orchard is chopped down.

Production history

The play opened on 17 January 1904, the director's birthday, at the Moscow Art Theatre under the direction of the actor-director Konstantin Stanislavski. During rehearsals, the structure of Act Two was re-written. Famously contrary to Chekhov's wishes, Stanislavski's version was, by and large, a tragedy. Chekhov disliked the Stanislavski production intensely, concluding that Stanislavski had "ruined" his play. In one of many letters on the subject, Chekhov would complain, "Anya, I fear, should not have any sort of tearful tone... Not once does my Anya cry, nowhere do I speak of a tearful tone, in the second act there are tears in their eyes, but the tone is happy, lively. Why did you speak in your telegram about so many tears in my play? Where are they? ... Often you will find the words "through tears," but I am describing only the expression on their faces, not tears. And in the second act there is no graveyard." The playwright's wife Olga Knipper played Madame Ranevskaya in the original Moscow Art Theatre production, as well as in the 300th production of the play by the theatre in 1943.

Although critics at the time were divided in their response to the play, the debut of The Cherry Orchard by the Moscow Art Theatre on 17 January 1904 (Stanislavski's birthday) was a resounding theatrical success and the play was almost immediately presented in many of the important provincial cities. This success was not confined only to Russia, as the play was soon seen abroad with great acclaim as well. Shortly after the play's debut, Chekhov departed for Germany due to his worsening health, and by July 1904 he was dead.

The modest and newly urbanized audiences attending pre-revolutionary performances at S. V. Panin's People's House in Saint Petersburg reportedly cheered as the cherry orchard was felled on-stage.

A production in 1925 at the Oxford Playhouse by J. B. Fagan and a production in 1934 at the Sadler's Wells Theatre in London directed by Tyrone Guthrie and translated by Hubert Butler were among the first English-language productions of the play.

A television version featuring Helen Hayes as Ranevskaya, and Susan Strasberg as Anya, directed by Daniel Petrie, was broadcast as part of the Play of the Week television series in 1959.

A Royal Shakespeare Company/BBC Television version from 1962 was directed by Michael Elliott from Michel Saint-Denis stage production. This version has been released on DVD by BBC Worldwide.

The Stratford Festival of Canada mounted productions in 1965, 1987 and 1998.  The 1965 production was in fact the first time that a Chekhov play had been performed there. Furthermore, The Cherry Orchard marked the Stratford directorial debut of John Hirsch.   Three of the original Stratford company members were in the cast: William Hutt, playing Gaev; Douglas Campbell, as Lopakhin; and William Needles, in the role of Yepihodov; and three women who are considered among the pre-eminent actors Canada has produced: Frances Hyland (Varya), Kate Reid (Ranevskaya), and Martha Henry (Dunyasha).  Also in the cast were  Powys Thomas (Fiers); Mervyn Blake (Pishtchik); and Mary Savidge (Charlotta), and Canadian born and trained actors: Bruno Gerussi (Yasha); Hugh Webster (Trofimov); and Susan Ringwood (Anya).

A production starring Irene Worth as Ranevskaya, Raul Julia as Lopakhin, Mary Beth Hurt as Anya and Meryl Streep as Dunyasha, directed by Andrei Șerban and featuring Tony Award-winning costumes and set by Santo Loquasto, opened at the Lincoln Center for the Performing Arts in 1977.

A production directed by Peter Hall, translated by Michael Frayn and starring Dorothy Tutin as Ranevskaya, Albert Finney as Lopakhin, Ben Kingsley as Trofimov and Ralph Richardson as Firs, appeared at the Royal National Theatre in London in 1978 to nearly universal acclaim. A minimalist production directed by Peter Gill opened at the Riverside Studios in London also in 1978, to good reviews.

In 1981, Peter Brook mounted a production in French (La Cérisaie) with an international cast including Brook's wife Natasha Parry as Ranevskaya, Niels Arestrup as Lopakhin, and Michel Piccoli as Gayev. The production was remounted at the Brooklyn Academy of Music in 1988 after tours through Africa and the Middle East.

Also in 1981, the BBC produced a version for British television by Trevor Griffiths from a translation by Helen Rappaport and directed by Richard Eyre. Instead of her 1962 BBC role as daughter Anya, Judi Dench here played the mother Ranevskaya to Bill Paterson's Lopakhin, Anton Lesser as Trofimov, Frederick Treves as Gayev, Anna Massey as Charlotta, and a 24-year-old Timothy Spall as Yepikhodov.

The Stratford Festival’s 1987 production also used the Trevor Griffiths text, and subtly shifted the play's emphasis from Madame Ranyevskaya's economic demise to the ascent of Lopakhin.  James Blendick as Lopakhin was praised for his skillful man-on-the-rise performance. The 1998 Festival production, directed by Diana Leblanc, was based on a new translation by American-born / Canadian playwright John Murell. Among its cast was Martha Henry (Ranevskaya), Stephen Russell (Leonid), Anne Ross (Anya) and Sarah Dodd (Varya).  Variety noted that: “Leblanc has...remembered that this is a tragicomedy...avoided the obvious and encouraged her actors to find humor rather than high drama. It works beautifully because there is drama aplenty in merely playing these characters with integrity.”  

A Welsh language version Y Gelli Geirios translated by W. Gareth Jones was performed for the first time on 19 February 1991 by Cwmni Theatr Gwynedd in Theatr Gwynedd, Bangor.

A film version starring Charlotte Rampling as Ranevskaya, Alan Bates as Gayev, Owen Teale as Lopakhin, Melanie Lynskey as Dunyasha and Gerard Butler as Yasha, directed by Michael Cacoyannis, appeared in 1999.

An L.A. Theatre Works recorded version of the play was produced in 2002 starring Marsha Mason, Charles Durning, Hector Elizondo, and Jennifer Tilly. Others in the cast were Jordan Baker, Jon Chardiet, Michael Cristofer, Tim DeKay, Jeffrey Jones, Christy Keef, Amy Pietz, and Joey Slotnick.

Wekande Walauwa, 2002, a Sinhalese film adapted to Sri Lankan family context was directed by the prominent Sri Lankan director Lester James Peries.
 
The Steppenwolf Theatre Company (Chicago, Illinois) performed a version that was translated by its Associate Artistic Director, Curt Columbus, and directed by ensemble member Tina Landau. The play premiered on 4 November 2004 and ran until 5 March 2005 at the Upstairs Theatre. Appearing in the performance were Robert Breuler, Francis Guinan, Amy Morton, Yasen Peyankov, Rondi Reed, Anne Adams, Guy Adkins, Chaon Cross, Leonard Kraft, Julian Martinez, Ned Noyes, Elizabeth Rich, Ben Viccellio, and Chris Yonan.

The Atlantic Theatre Company (New York City) in 2005 produced a new adaptation of The Cherry Orchard by Tom Donaghy, where much more of the comedy was present as the playwright had originally intended.

A new production of the play starring Annette Bening as Ranevskaya and Alfred Molina as Lopakhin, translated by Martin Sherman and directed by Sean Mathias, opened at the Mark Taper Forum in Los Angeles in February 2006.

The Huntington Theatre Company at Boston University produced a version in January 2007 using Richard Nelson's translation, directed by Nicholas Martin with Kate Burton as Madame Ranevskaya, Joyce Van Patten as Charlotta Ivanovna, and Dick Latessa as Firs.

Jonathan Miller directed the play in March–April 2007 at the Crucible Theatre, Sheffield, England. The play represents Miller's return to the British stage after nearly a decade away and stars Joanna Lumley as Ranevskaya.

Libby Appel adapted and directed the play in 2007 for her farewell season as artistic director of the Oregon Shakespeare Festival (Ashland, Oregon).  The new translation, based on an original literal translation by Allison Horsley, is considered to be "strongly Americanized".

A version of the play was performed as the opening production on the Chichester Festival Theatre Stage in May–June 2008, with a cast including Dame Diana Rigg, Frank Finlay, Natalie Cassidy, Jemma Redgrave and Maureen Lipman.

In 2009, a new version of the play by Tom Stoppard was performed as the first production of The Bridge Project, a partnership between North American and UK theatres. The play ran at the Brooklyn Academy of Music. Sam Mendes directed the production with a cast including Simon Russell Beale, Sinéad Cusack, Richard Easton, Rebecca Hall and Ethan Hawke.

A brand new adaptation of the play was produced by the Blackeyed Theatre in spring 2009 as a UK tour, with a cast of four.

In September 2009, a new adaptation of the play by Stuart Paterson was produced at the Dundee Repertory Theatre with guest director Vladimir Bouchler.

A new translation of the play in Punjabi was performed in September 2009 by the students of Theatre Art Department of Punjabi University, Patiala, India.

A version of the play in Afrikaans was performed in late September 2009 by students of the Department of Drama at the University of Cape Town, South Africa.

A new adaption was commissioned by the Brighton Festival and performed by the Dreamthinkspeak group. They renovated the old co-op home-store on the London Road using the whole store as a stage. They renamed it Before I Sleep and said it was inspired by the original play. It received positive reviews from both The Guardian and The Independent newspapers. It was funded by Arts Council England, National Lottery and a long list of other Brighton and Hove based businesses.

In April 2010 at the Royal Lyceum Theatre in Edinburgh the Scottish playwright John Byrne staged a new version of the play as a Scottish 'social comedy', taking place in 1979 Scotland.

The Royal National Theatre in London staged a new version starring Zoë Wanamaker from May to August 2011, reuniting director Howard Davies with writer Andrew Upton, which was also shown at cinemas internationally through National Theatre Live.

The Eastern Bohemian Theatre, Pardubice, Czech Republic. Directed by Petr Novotný. Translated by Leoš Suchařípa. Starring: Jindra Janoušková (Ranevskaya), Petra Tenorová (Anya), Kristina Jelínková (Varya), Zdeněk Rumpík (Gayev), Jiří Kalužný (Lopakhin), Miloslav Tichý (Trofimov), Martin Mejzlík (Simeonov-Pishchik), Lída Vlášková (Charlotte), Ladislav Špiner (Yepikhodov), Martina Sikorová (Dunyasha), Václav Dušek (Firs), Jan Musil (Yasha), Radek Žák (Stationmaster), Alexandr Postler (Stranger). The play had its premiere on 16 October 2011 and last performance on 14 January 2012.

The Vinohrady Theatre, Prague. Directed by Vladimír Morávek. Starring Dagmar Veškrnová-Havlová, Jiřina Jirásková (Charlotte), Viktor Preiss, Pavla Tomicová, Martin Stropnický, Lucie Juřičková, Svatopluk Skopal, Andrea Elsnerová, Pavel Batěk, Ilja Racek, Martin Zahálka, Jiří Dvořák, Jiří Žák. The play had its premiere on 5 February 2008.

The Komorní scéna Aréna, Ostrava. Directed by Ivan Krejčí. Starring Alena Sasínová-Polarczyk, Tereza Dočkalová, Petra Kocmanová, Norbert Lichý, Josef Kaluža, Michal Čapka, Dušan Škubal, Dana Fialková, Michal Moučka, Tereza Cisovská, Pavel Cisovský, Albert Čuba, Marek Cisovský, René Šmotek. The play had its premiere on 21 March 2009.

The Theatre Workshop of Nantucket staged a new adaptation and translation of Chekhov's Cherry Orchard set on Nantucket in 1972. The play premiered on 14 September 2012. It was directed by Anne Breeding and Gregory Stroud, and translated and adapted by Gregory Stroud.

The Stage Center Theatre at Northeastern Illinois University, Chicago, Illinois, presented a new version of The Cherry Orchard, adapted and directed by Dan Wirth, in October, 2013.

PK Productions will premiere a new version of The Cherry Orchard in November 2014 at the New Wimbledon Theatre.  Adapted by director Patrick Kennedy, the production updates the setting to London in 1976.

Directed by Katie Mitchell, The Cherry Orchard opened at The Young Vic Theatre in London on 10 October 2014

A production of the Michael Frayn translation was produced at Helmsley Arts Centre in Helmsley, North Yorkshire in May 2015, directed by David Powley.

Clemence Williams directed New Theatre (Sydney) production of David Mamet's adaptation 26 April – 28 May 2016 with an original musical score by Eliza Scott.

Roundabout Theatre Company presented a new adaptation by Stephen Karam on Broadway at the American Airlines Theatre, starring Diane Lane as Ranevskaya. Previews began on 15 September 2016, with opening night on 16 October. The production was directed by Simon Godwin, with scenic design by Scott Pask, costume design by Michael Krass, lighting design by Donald Holder, sound design by Christopher Cronin, movement by Jonathan Goddard, and original music by Nico Muhly.

During its 2018 season, Shaw Festival in Niagara-on-the Lake, Ontario presented a world premiere of The Orchard (after Chekov). Described as  The Cherry Orchard transformed into the tale of a Punjabi-Sikh family fighting to hold onto their Okanagan Valley orchard, this version is based on the author Sarena Parmar’s own childhood in British Columbia. “This fresh adaptation confronts life, loss and the Canadian immigrant experience with both bravery and beauty...”   It will go on to be produced at the Arts Club in Vancouver, B.C. in April 2019.

A new radio version by Katherine Tozer and composer John Chambers was produced for BBC's Drama on 3, airing for the first time on 18 October 2018.

The Moscow Pushkin Drama Theatre will be presenting their adaptation of the play with the Cherry Orchard Festival at the New York City Center in June 2020. Directed by Vladimir Mirzoev, and starring Victoria Isakova, Aleksander Petrov, Mikhail Zhigalov, and Maxim Vitorgan, and has been described as, "Visually striking, psychologically nuanced and hypnotically performed Russian staging of Chekhov's play"

An English language visual novel adaptation, produced by Manuela Malasaña, was released in November 2020.

In 2022, a high-tech adaptation entitled The Orchard at the Baryshnikov Arts Center, featuring Mikhail Baryshnikov and Jessica Hecht.

An English language adaptation by Vinay Patel in a science fiction setting was performed at The Yard Theatre in London in 2022.

Legacy

The theatre scholar Michael Goldman has referred to the character  Charlotta Ivanovna playing the governess in this play as prototypical of characters Chekhov had visited in many of his plays. As Goldman states: "Everyone in Chekhov resembles Charlotta Ivanovna... with her card tricks, and ventriloquism. Each in his own way attempts a kind of magic, a spiritual mumbo-jumbo, a little number designed to charm or placate or simply elegize reality – the reality of life slipping away, of the dissolving process. They are sad clowns, redeemed only by being fully felt as people, and not the comic icons they are always threatening to become – failed shamans, whose magic does not work though it has cost them everything to perform."

The Japanese manga Sakura no Sono (1985-86) and its live-action film adaptations are about a drama group in a girls-only private high school putting on a production of The Cherry Orchard. 

The play has a role in the comedy film Henry's Crime (2011).

Editions

English translations

References

External links

 Full text of The Cherry Orchard 
 Project Gutenberg eText, English translations of several Chekhov plays, including The Cherry Orchard
 A public domain version of the play (English translation)
 [http://www.shmoop.com/cherry-orchard/ The Cherry Orchard] study guide, themes, quotes, teacher resources
 

Russian plays
Cherry Orchard, The
1904 plays